Komm, süßer Tod is German for Come, Sweet Death and may refer:

 Komm, süßer Tod (novel), a 1998 novel by Wolf Haas
 Komm, süßer Tod (film), a 2000 Austrian film based on the novel
 "Komm, süßer Tod, komm selge Ruh", a piece by Johann Sebastian Bach
 "Komm, süsser Tod", a song from the soundtrack of the film The End of Evangelion
 "Komm süßer Tod", a song by Eisbrecher from their album Sünde